The sarcastic fringehead (Neoclinus blanchardi) is a small but very hardy saltwater fish that has a large mouth and aggressive territorial behavior, for which it has been given its common name.  When two fringeheads have a territorial battle, they wrestle by pressing their distended mouths against each other, as if they were kissing.  This allows them to determine which is the larger fish, which establishes dominance.

The swimming movements of these fish are complicated. Their swimming consists of short, fast, dart-like movements.

They are generally brown in color. Sarcastic fringeheads are a species of tube blenny and tend to hide inside shells or crevices, though some have been found living in man-made objects, such as a soda can. After the female spawns under a rock or in clam burrows, the male guards the eggs. During squid spawning season, they eat large numbers of squid eggs.

They are found in the Pacific, off the coast of North America, from San Francisco, California, to central Baja California.

The specific name honours Dr. S. B. Blanchard of San Diego, California, who collected specimens of this blenny, and passed them on to Charles Frédéric Girard, who described it.

References

External links 

 University of Michigan Animal Diversity Web
 Strange Fish Identification Website

Sarcastic fringehead
Fish of the Pacific Ocean
Fish described in 1858